Ronkonkoma (signed as Ronkonkoma L.I. MacArthur Airport on station signage) is a major railroad station and transportation hub along the Main Line of the Long Island Rail Road in Ronkonkoma, New York. The station is the eastern terminus of the Ronkonkoma Branch and the western terminus of the Greenport Branch.

The station is located on Lakeland Street or Railroad Avenue North across from the intersection of Hawkins Avenue, and has parking facilities and other amenities that extend beyond the central location. Free parking is available in the lots adjacent to the tracks on the north and south side. One parking garage north of the station was built in 1996 on a former freight spur. The station has a total of about 6,100 parking spaces.

History
Ronkonkoma Station was originally built as Lake Ronkonkoma station in 1883 as a replacement for the 1843-built Lakeland station designed to serve both Lakeland and Ronkonkoma, New York, as well as the 1853-built Hermanville station, designed for a former community along the south side of the tracks.

Lake Road and Lakeland stations
Lakeland was originally built in 1843 as Lake Road station. It was named for and located on Lake Road (now Pond Road), a street that once ran from Oakdale to the east side of Lake Ronkonkoma itself. By 1850 it was moved to the Dr. E. F. Peck General Store on the northwest corner of what is today Ocean Avenue and Lakeland Street. A freight house existed along the tracks close to Pine Avenue. Edgar Fenn Peck owned land as far south as Sayville, and in 1851 sold the store and the land to a developer named Charles Wood, who turned his land into a development named Lakeland Farms, which today includes land in Oakdale, Bohemia, and what is now Ronkonkoma. The original Lake Road station operated simultaneously with the one at the general store on Ocean Avenue, and at some point was renamed "Lake station," until eventually being phased out. No record of the original station's existence can be found after 1857.

Hermanville station
Hermanville or Hermannville was another station stop along the Greenport Branch of the Long Island Rail Road, located east of the former Lake Road Station. It first appeared on an 1850 map of the Long Island Rail Road. The station had one side platform, and two tracks. An 1852 advertisement for Hermanville in a few books mention the Long Island Rail Road. Hermannville also made an appearance on the 1855 Colton map. On the Map of The Village of Hermannville, Town of Islip, Suffolk County, Long Island, Hemannville station is shown as being at the intersection of the Main Line and Herman Avenue, which today is part of the Ronkonkoma Yard.

After Lakeland
Lake Ronkonkoma station replaced Lakeland station in 1883 and was designed to serve both Lakeland and Ronkonkoma, New York. At some point, the word "Lake" was dropped from the station name. The station house burned on February 7, 1933 and a temporary rectangular one-story building with a gabled roof was used until September 1937, when the second Ronkonkoma station was completed. Throughout much of the 20th Century, it also served as a sizeable freight hub for Central Suffolk County.

Since December 28, 1987, it has been the east end of the Main Line electrification but stations east of Ronkonkoma have been modified for future electrification. The 1937 station was used for storage until it was razed in 1994 when part of the parking lot was extended westward. The current station was designed by architect Richard Henry Behr. Ronkonkoma Yard is also located east of the station, in close proximity to the former Holbrook station, which was torn down in 1962, and has taken in commuters from the former Holtsville station since March 16, 1998.

Station layout
This station is set up using the Spanish solution with three high-level platforms, each 12 cars long. Platform B, an island platform, facilitates a cross-platform interchange when a Ronkonkoma Branch train and a Greenport train arrive at the same time on opposite tracks.

Mid-Suffolk Yard
East of the Ronkonkoma station is a 12-track train-storage yard called the Ronkonkoma Yard. As this is the eastern end of the electrified portion of the Main Line, the yard stores the electric multiple units that are used on the Ronkonkoma Branch.

In preparation for the LIRR's East Side Access expansion to Grand Central Terminal, the MTA is adding 11 new tracks to the yard, for a total of 23 tracks. The expansion will use space already owned by the MTA located immediately to the south of the existing rail yard and north of MacArthur Airport. The increase in storage space will allow the MTA to increase peak-hour service to Manhattan. The project is budgeted for $128.0 million. Locations in Deer Park, Central Islip, and Yaphank were also considered for the construction of the yard. The Deer Park option was dismissed as it would have impacted several grade crossings, duplicated employee facilities and as it would not have benefited riders east of the station. The Central Islip site was dismissed as it would have been located in Connetquot River State Park. The Yaphank option was rejected because of the high cost of electrification and the requirement that stations between Ronkonkoma and Yaphank receive upgrades.

Construction was expected to be finished by late 2018. However,  construction was to start in September 2017, with completion being pushed back to March 2020. A construction award was finally made in December 2017, and the completion date was pushed back to late 2020.

See also 

 Ronkonkoma Branch
 Long Island MacArthur Airport

References

External links
 

Unofficial Long Island Railroad History web site
NYCSUBWAY.org
October 1, 2002 Photos of Ronkonkoma Station platforms
May 16, 1981 photo taken from the vicinity of Ronkonkoma Station
Photo of the station taken in the 1960s from a bridge
Unofficial LIRR Photography Site (lirrpics.com) Ronkonkoma Station
 KO Interlocking (The LIRR Today)
 Station House from Google Maps Street View

Long Island Rail Road stations in Suffolk County, New York
Brookhaven, New York
Islip (town), New York
Railway stations in the United States opened in 1883
Airport railway stations in the United States